Tehelné pole was a neighborhood in Bratislava, Slovakia, characterized by the presence of several sports facilities. Administratively, the neighborhood belongs to Nové Mesto borough, situated around 5 km north-east of the centre. The German and Hungarian names for this locality are Ziegelfeld and Téglamező.

Football 
Most commonly, the name refers to the football stadium in this district which is the home ground of Slovan Bratislava and the regular home for the Slovakia national team. The stadium has a capacity of 30,085 spectators and is 105 m long and 68 m wide. It was built during the First Slovak Republic, when Nazi Germany occupied Petržalka in 1938 and Bratislava lost almost all of its sporting facilities. The construction lasted from 1939 to 1944 and the stadium became the home ground for Slovan Bratislava. The stadium was officially opened in September 1940 with 25,000 places, and the first international match was played on 27 October 1940, with Slovan Bratislava playing against Hertha Berlin, ending in a 2–2 tie.

The old stadium underwent reconstruction in 1961, which added a second stand, boosting its capacity to 45,000, as well as a score table, artificial lighting and revamping the field. Later, the capacity was increased to 50,000, and just before the breakup of Czechoslovakia, it was the largest stadium in use (Strahov Stadium in Prague had a capacity of 220,000 but was disused in the 1990s) and was the home ground for the Czechoslovak national team.

The stadium was reconstructed once more in the 1990s to an "all-seater" stadium, reducing the capacity into 30,000. After this, the Tehelné pole stadium was the second-largest in Slovakia after Všešportový areál in Košice, however, that stadium is now disused. In 2005–06, it was also used as the "home" ground for FC Artmedia Bratislava in that club's Champions League and UEFA Cup campaigns, as Artmedia's own ground did not meet minimum standards for UEFA competitions. 

It is planned that the current stadium will be demolished and a new one with the capacity around 35,000 people will be built, costing around €80 million. The need for a new stadium stems from UEFA rules requiring international matches to be played in stadiums of certain standards from 2008, however, Slovakia lacks these stadiums. In July 2009, the Slovak government decided to support the construction of new stadium. The demolition works were planned for March–April 2010 and the new stadium was planned to open in December 2017. Its capacity was planned to be 22,000 spectators with a possible enlargement to 30,000.

Lido
A lido (swimming pool) with the same name was built near the football stadium in 1939. It survives to the present day and currently has three swimming pools of varying size, with additional services.

Other stadiums/venues nearby
Other stadiums or venues near Tehelné pole locality include Štadión Pasienky (built 1962), home ground for FK Inter Bratislava, ice hockey Ondrej Nepela Arena (built 2011), home of the KHL team HC Slovan Bratislava and the National Tennis Centre, which is used for Fed Cup as well as Davis Cup matches, concerts and other events.

Photo Gallery

References

Citations

General references

External links 
 Stadium Database
 Flickr: Photos tagged with "Tehelné pole"

Sport in Bratislava
Defunct football venues in Slovakia
Buildings and structures in Bratislava
Sports venues completed in 1939